Slovakia national bandy team is competing for Slovakia in the international bandy and rink bandy tournaments.

The debut came in a friendly rink bandy match against the Czech Republic, and the first international tournament was the European Rink Bandy Cup 2017 in Nymburk.

The country made its World Championship debut in the 2018 tournament.

References

External links

National bandy teams
Bandy
Bandy in Slovakia
Sport in Slovakia